The eighth season of Deutschland sucht den Superstar was broadcast on German channel RTL from 8 January to 7 May 2011. The winner got a recording contract with Universal Music Group. Nina Eichinger and Volker Neumüller were removed from the panel and were replaced by Fernanda Brandão and Patrick Nuo. Marco Schreyl returned as the host. DSDS has extended participation privileges to Austria and Switzerland. Pietro Lombardi won the competition.

Sixty people were injured on 27 March in a stampede when a large crowd showed up for an autograph session with this season's participants at CentrO in Oberhausen. More than two dozen people were hospitalized. The victims of the injuries were between 12 and 17 years old and injuries include broken bones, shock, and loss of consciousness. Emergency treatment tents to handle the crowd. The organizers were only expecting 5,000 fans to show up, but an estimated 19,000 people attended. There were no charges laid after the investigation was completed in July.

Controversies
The Hamburger Morgenpost questioned whether RTL misquoted DSDS Top 10 candidate Anna-Carina Woitschack. In an interview, Anna-Carina was quoted as saying "It was cut together all wrong. I never said that I hate Sarah - but on the contrary, I do not hate Sarah Engels. That is what I said. But it was cut this way by RTL, because it looks good for the show."

RTL received a statement from the Office of Public Safety stating that Sebastian Wurth was not allowed to participate after 10 pm. RTL was also fined €15,000 for the incident.

The Hamburger Morgenpost questioned whether the liveshows were actually live broadcast. In the third "Mottoshow", Marco Angelini slipped up in his performance and forgot to sing at the correct time.

Pietro Lombardi's brother posted nude picture of Sarah Engels after she used Pietro's cell phone to talk to girls. The hardcore fans of Pietro Lombardi told his brother Marco about this and he was not happy about this. So, he decided to take "revenge". Pietro's brother also wrote "Everyone knows how cheap Sarah Engels is. She is sneaky. A liar."

DSDS host Marco Schreyl mixed up the phone numbers for candidates Zazou Mall and Marco Angelini. A camera shot of Marco Angelini showed him enraged towards the lens. A reporter for the Hamburger Morgenpost, who was present, reported there were chaotic scenes shortly before the end of the recording. Dieter Bohlen mentioned the mistake and Marco Schreyl replied that "It could be made easier for the host". RTL decided that no candidate would be eliminated and the final show has been pushed back a week and is now scheduled to air on 7 May.

On the sixth Mottoshow, Sarah Engels had two wardrobe incidents, when dancing to "Walking on Sunshine", where she began dancing too close to one of the cameras, causing two upskirts. This was eventually shown to the studio audience during the recap of her performance and was noted by the judges.

Auditions
As with season 7, an audition truck, in which the candidates can qualify for the televised auditions, stopped in various cities in Germany, Austria and Switzerland between August 2010 and October 2010. Open auditions took place in September 2010 in Cologne, Munich, Hamburg and Berlin. 34,956 people auditioned throughout the 35 cities that hosted auditions. 135 candidates advanced to the Recall. Menderes Bagci, who failed in the auditions in the previous 7 seasons, advanced to the recall.

"Recall"
The first "recall" show aired on 2 February. The 135 candidates who advanced to the Recall were split up into groups where the judges picked 60 candidates for the next round. The 60 candidates who advanced participated in groups and duets. Nico Raecke, who originally was one of the participants advancing to the Top 35, was thrown out of Deutschland sucht den Superstar because of his arrest for robbery and assault. Menderes Bagci was one of the candidates eliminated on 5 February Recall show. The Top 35 went to the Maldives.

Finalists
(Ages stated at time of contest)

"Die Top 15 – Jetzt oder nie" (The Top 15 – Now or Never)
Original airdate: 19 February 2011

Advancing to Top 10 (Public votes): Norman, Marvin, Marco, Sebastian, Pietro, Ardian, Anna-Carina

Advancing to Top 10 (Jury selection): Sarah, Zazou, Nina

"Mottoshows" (theme shows)

Top 10 - "Megahits"
Original airdate: 26 February 2011

Jury Elimination Forecast: Nina Richel or Zazou Mall (Dieter & Fernanda), Nina Richel (Patrick)
Bottom 3: Nina Richel, Norman Langen & Sarah Engels
Eliminated: Sarah Engels

Top 9 - "Apres-Ski Hits"
Original airdate: 5 March 2011

Jury Elimination Forecast: Nina Richel (Dieter & Patrick), Norman Langen or Nina Richel (Fernanda)
Bottom 3: Anna-Carina Woitschack, Ardian Bujupi & Marvin Cybulski
Eliminated: Marvin Cybulski

Top 8 - "Frühlings Gefühle" (Spring Feelings)
Original airdate: 12 March 2011

Jury Elimination Forecast: Ardian Bujupi or Zazou Mall (Dieter), Ardian Bujupi (Fernanda), Can't Decide (Patrick)
Bottom 3: Zazou Mall, Norman Langen & Anna-Carina Woitschack
Eliminated: Anna-Carina Woitschack

Top 7 - "Party Kracher" (Party Hits)
Original airdate: 19 March 2011

Jury Elimination Forecast: Zazou Mall or Norman Langen (Dieter, Fernanda & Patrick)
Bottom 3: Sebastian Wurth, Marco Angelini & Norman Langen
Eliminated: Norman Langen

Top 6 - "English & German Hits"
Original airdate: 2 April 2011

Jury Elimination Forecast: Zazou Mall, Marco Angelini
No elimination after wrong televoting numbers were announced for Zazou and Marco.

Top 6 - "America vs Europe"
Original airdate: 9 April 2011

Jury Elimination Forecast: Marco Angelini or Zazou Mall
Bottom 2: Marco Angelini & Zazou Mall
Eliminated: Zazou Mall

Top 5 - "Hits of the 80's, 90's, and Today"
Original airdate: 16 April 2011

Jury Elimination Forecast: —
Bottom 2: Ardian Bujupi & Sebastian Wurth
Eliminated: Sebastian Wurth

Top 4 - "Pop, Rock and Discofever"
Original airdate: 23 April 2011

Jury Elimination Forecast: Marco Angelini (Patrick Nuo), Pietro Lombardi (Fernanda Brandão), No one (Dieter Bohlen)
Bottom 2: Marco Angelini & Sarah Engels
Eliminated: Marco Angelini

Top 3 - Semifinal
Original airdate: 30 April 2011

Jury Elimination Forecast: Can't Decide
Bottom 2: Pietro Lombardi & Ardian Bujupi
Eliminated: Ardian Bujupi

Top 2 - Final (Contestant's Choice, Highlight Song & Winner's Single)
Original airdate: 7 May 2010

Judges' forecasts of who would win: Sarah Engels (Patrick), Pietro Lombardi (Fernanda & Dieter)
Winner: Pietro Lombardi
Runner-Up: Sarah Engels

Group song
Top 15: "Higher" by Taio Cruz ft. Kylie Minogue
Top 10: "Club Can't Handle Me" by Flo Rida ft. David Guetta
Top 9: "The Time (Dirty Bit)" by The Black Eyed Peas
Top 8: "Turn Around (5, 4, 3, 2, 1)" by Flo Rida
Top 7: "Yeah 3x" by Chris Brown
Top 6: "On The Floor" by Jennifer Lopez ft. Pitbull
Top 6: "Who's That Chick" by David Guetta ft. Rihanna
Top 5: "I Gotta Feeling" by The Black Eyed Peas
Top 4: "Crying at the Discoteque" by Alcazar
Top 3: "When Love Takes Over" by David Guetta ft. Kelly Rowland
Top 2: "We've Got Tonight" by Ronan Keating ft. Jeanette Biedermann  "The Time (Dirty Bit)" by Black Eyed Peas Top 10: "Higher" by the Taio Cruz ft. Kylie Minogue (without Pietro and Sarah)

Elimination chart 

On 19 February it was intended that the viewers would choose 7 and the judges 3 finalists. The judges, or mostly Dieter Bohlen, however chose not to decide and therefore the three people with the next highest votes made it through to the finals automatically. They were Sarah Engels, Zazou Mall and Nina Richel.
On 10 March, Nina Richel was taken out of the competition due to her numerous breakdowns. It was stated that she withdrew, however as it turned out RTL took Richel out against her will. She was replaced by Sarah Engels who returned after a one-week absence since her original elimination - finishing 2nd instead of 10th, Engels became the most successful replacement candidate in the history of the show.
 On 2 April RTL switched the numbers of Zazou Mall and Marco Angelini several times during the recap. The voting was therefore stopped at the beginning of the results and it was announced that no one would get eliminated that week and that the series will be extended with a one-week delay for the final. All votes that came in before the first mistake, were included in the result of the following week, people who called later got a refund.

Top 10 candidates

Pietro Lombardi
Pietro Lombardi (born in Karlsruhe).

Sarah Engels
Sarah Engels was born in Cologne on 15 October 1992. She had been taking vocal lessons for four years before participating in DSDS and took part in street festivals on many occasions. She was also on DSDS in season 6 where she was eliminated in the recall after a duet with Eugen Flittner. She was eliminated in the Top 10. However, on 10 March, Nina Richel had to leave DSDS as a result of bad health conditions, which resulted in Engels taking her place.

Ardian Bujupi
Ardian Bujupi was born in Pristina, Yugoslavia and lives in Heidelberg today.

Marco Angelini
Marco Angelini (born in Voitsberg, Austria). He completed his medical study shortly after the casting and is going to write his thesis after his departure from DSDS. He also planned to write a book about his time at the casting show and his impressions of it. He is lead singer of the Austrian-based rock band Black Balloon.

Sebastian Wurth
Sebastian Wurth was born in Wipperfürth on 24 July 1994. He is the youngest participant in this year's season. Dieter Bohlen saw great potential in him. Wurth is often compared with Justin Bieber because of their similar hair style. He is a fan of Bayern Munich.

Zazou Mall
Zazou Mall (Born in Zürich, Switzerland)

Norman Langen
Norman Langen was born in Badenberg on 7 March 1985. He likes to sing in German, and likes Schlager, pop and dance music. He is a trained welder but is retraining as a hospice nurse. He has previously sung in a boy band (BXess, later Manhattan). He has three sisters.

Anna-Carina Woitschack
Anna-Carina Woitschack (born in Kamern).

Nina Richel
Nina Richel was born in Hildesheim. The then-17-year-old contestant has been eliminated by RTL chief Tom Sänger after the second "Mottoshow", allegedly for health reasons. Some days later she has told the whole story. After Sänger's decision Sarah Engels, not Marvin Cybulski, was invited for a comeback.

Marvin Cybulski
Marvin Cybulski (born in Hanover).

References

Season 08
2011 in German music
2011 German television seasons